Jive Electro was a sublabel of the Zomba Group's Jive Records noted for releasing albums by Groove Armada, Hardknox, and Tangerine Dream as well as few remixes for the Madchester band The Stone Roses.

The label was largely active between 1984 and 1987. Jive resurrected it in the 1998 to accommodate a boom in electronic music, but it appears to be inactive since Zomba and Jive were integrated into a major label structure in 2004.

See also
 List of record labels

External links
 Jive Electro
 Discogs.com Profile

Defunct record labels of the United Kingdom
Electronic music record labels
Record labels established in 1984
Zomba Group of Companies subsidiaries